Panatina is a suburb of Honiara, Solomon Islands and is located West of the main center.

References

Populated places in Guadalcanal Province
Suburbs of Honiara